Golden is an unincorporated community and census-designated place in southeastern Barry County, Missouri, United States. It is located south of Table Rock Lake and one mile north of Missouri Route 86 on Highway J. At the 2020 census, Golden had a population of 275.

A post office called Golden has been in operation since 1876. The community most likely was named after the local Golden family.

Demographics

Education
It is in the Cassville R-IV School District.

References

Census-designated places in Missouri
Unincorporated communities in Barry County, Missouri
Unincorporated communities in Missouri
Census-designated places in Barry County, Missouri